Anifah bin Haji Aman @ Haniff Amman (Jawi: عنيفه بن أمان @ حنيف أمان; born 16 November 1953) is a Malaysian politician who has served as Special Advisor to the Chief Minister of Sabah Hajiji Noor on International Relations and Foreign Investments since January 2023 and 3rd President of the Love Sabah Party (PCS) since July 2020. He served as the Minister of Foreign Affairs of Malaysia from April 2009 to May 2018 and the Member of Parliament (MP) for Beaufort from November 1999 to March 2004 and for Kimanis from March 2004 to January 2019. He was a member of the United Malays National Organisation (UMNO), a component party of the Barisan Nasional (BN) coalition before leaving it to be an independent in September 2018.

Personal life 
Anifah is married to Siti Rubiah Abdul Samad and has 3 sons. He is the younger half brother of former Chief Minister of Sabah, Musa Aman. His nephew, Yamani Hafez Musa who is Musa's son; is the MP for Sipitang.

Political career 
Anifah was first elected to Parliament in 1999 general election, winning the seat of Beaufort. He was immediately appointed Deputy Minister of Primary Industries in the government of Mahathir Mohamad. He shifted to, and won, the seat of Kimanis in the 2004 general election and became Deputy Minister for Plantation Industries and Commodities. After winning re-election in the 2008 general election, Prime Minister Abdullah Ahmad Badawi appointed him as Deputy Transport Minister. However, Anifah refused, saying he felt it was "time to make way" for someone else. Reports indicated this was the first time anyone had refused an appointment as Deputy Minister after the appointment had already been made public. A day later, the New Straits Times reported that Anifah and another proposed Deputy Minister, Tengku Azlan Abu Bakar, had "thrown a tantrum ... claiming they are 'senior enough' to be made full ministers". Abdullah reportedly told them that he had "picked the best people", leading to their resignations.

After Najib Razak replaced Abdullah as Prime Minister in 2009, Anifah was promoted from the backbench to the Cabinet as Minister for Foreign Affairs. During Anifah's tenure as Foreign Minister, Malaysia won election as a non-permanent member of the United Nations Security Council for the 2015–2016 term.

Amid retaining his Kimanis seat for the fourth consecutive term in the 2018 general election (GE14) which saw the downfall of BN's federal and state governments, Anifah announced his resignation from UMNO to be an independent MP in September 2018. On 16 August 2019, the Malaysian Election Court however has voided his win in the GE14 after the court found serious discrepancies in the conduct of the election process by the Election Commission (EC). He decided not to contest the 2020 Kimanis by-election called to focus on the subsequent 15th General Election instead.

In March 2020, a new opposition front with Anifah Aman as the president had been planned for the merger of Parti Gagasan Rakyat Sabah (PGRS), Love Sabah Party (PCS), Parti Kerjasama Anak Negeri (Anak Negeri) and yet-to-be registered Parti Hak Sabah.  However the plan fizzles out after Anifah had joined and was elected as PCS president instead in July 2020. He had become the new PCS president after winning the post uncontested during the party 2nd Biennial General Meeting (BGM) on 26 July 2020.

Special Advisor to the Chief Minister of Sabah on International Relations and Foreign Investments
On 30 January 2023, Chief Minister of Sabah Hajiji Noor appointed Anifah to a newly created position of the Special Advisor to the Chief Minister of Sabah on International Relations and Foreign Investments. Hajiji explained that he was confident of the extensive experience of Anifah in international relations that would assist the state government to forge good ties with foreign countries and investors and the appointment would argur well with the investor-friendly policy of Sabah. In response, Anifah thanked Hajiji for his confidence, gave assurance to do his best in the role, expressed his intention to establish Sabah as an investor-friendly destination, praised Hajiji of being visionary and highlighted the importance of international relations in bringing foreign investments to Sabah.

Election results

Honours
  :
  Knight Companion of the Order of the Crown of Pahang (DIMP) - Dato' (2004)
  Grand Knight of the Order of Sultan Ahmad Shah of Pahang (SSAP) - Dato' Sri (2009)
  :
  Commander of the Order of Kinabalu (PGDK) - Datuk (1998)
  Grand Commander of the Order of Kinabalu (SPDK) - Datuk Seri Panglima (2011)

See also 
 List of foreign ministers in 2017

References 

1953 births
Living people
People from Sabah
Kadazan-Dusun people
Malaysian people of Malay descent
Malaysian people of Pakistani descent
Malaysian people of Bruneian descent
Malaysian Muslims
Leaders of political parties in Malaysia
Independent politicians in Malaysia
Former United Malays National Organisation politicians
Members of the Dewan Rakyat
Government ministers of Malaysia
Foreign ministers of Malaysia
Alumni of the University of Buckingham
Commanders of the Order of Kinabalu
Grand Commanders of the Order of Kinabalu
21st-century Malaysian politicians